Shinsuke Kashiwagi (柏木 真介、born December 22, 1981) is a Japanese professional basketball player. He plays for the Niigata Albirex BB of the B.League. 
Kashiwagi was a member of the Japan national basketball team.  He played for the team in the 2006 FIBA World Championship and the FIBA Asia Championship 2007 and FIBA Asia Championship 2009.

In the 2009-10 season, Kashiwagi entered the month-long winter break averaging 13.7 points and 3.5 assists per game for the Seahorses.  He was named to the West squad for the 2009-10 JBL Super League All-Star game.

References

Japanese men's basketball players
1981 births
Living people
Nagoya Diamond Dolphins players
Niigata Albirex BB players
Basketball players at the 2006 Asian Games
Guards (basketball)
SeaHorses Mikawa players
Sun Rockers Shibuya players
2006 FIBA World Championship players
Asian Games competitors for Japan